Friedrich "Fritz" Hünenberger (14 March 1897 – 30 August 1976) was a Swiss weightlifter who competed in the 1920 Summer Olympics and in the 1924 Summer Olympics. He won two Olympic silver medals in the light-heavyweight class.

References

External links 
 

1897 births
1976 deaths
Swiss male weightlifters
Olympic weightlifters of Switzerland
Olympic silver medalists for Switzerland
Olympic medalists in weightlifting
Medalists at the 1920 Summer Olympics
Medalists at the 1924 Summer Olympics
Weightlifters at the 1920 Summer Olympics
Weightlifters at the 1924 Summer Olympics
World record setters in weightlifting